The Party of the Democratic Center was a political party in Mexico.

In the presidential elections of 2 July 2000, its candidate Manuel Camacho Solís won 0.6% of the popular vote. In the senatorial elections of the same date, the party won 1.4% but no seats in the Senate. Since it did not secure parliamentary representation in 2003 it is not currently a nationally recognized party.

Defunct political parties in Mexico